Not to be confused with Planet Zahor, an alien planet.

Záhor is a village and municipality in the Sobrance District in the Košice Region of east Slovakia.

History
In historical records the village was first mentioned in 1326.

Geography
The village lies at an altitude of 109 metres and covers an area of 7.722 km².
It has a population of 710 people.

Facilities
The village has a soccer pitch.

External links
 
https://web.archive.org/web/20070513023228/http://www.statistics.sk/mosmis/eng/run.html

Villages and municipalities in Sobrance District